The Metropolitan Borough of Shoreditch was a Metropolitan borough of the County of London between 1899 and 1965, when it was merged with the Metropolitan Borough of Stoke Newington and the Metropolitan Borough of Hackney to form the London Borough of Hackney.

The borough was made up of three main districts: Shoreditch, Hoxton and Haggerston. An individual coat of arms was never granted to the metropolitan borough council; they adopted the arms of the second lord of the manor of Shoreditch, John de Northampton.

Boundaries
The borough comprised the area of the ancient parish of Shoreditch (St Leonard's) plus part of the ancient liberty of Norton Folgate to the south The parish vestry had taken on local administration from the 17th century onwards.

Civic buildings
The civic buildings of the borough included the Town Hall (originally the Vestry Hall) in Old Street with the Magistrates Court (derelict in 2007), the Coroner's Court in Boundary St and other civic offices nearby.

Motto
The borough motto commemorates the provision of electric power to the borough from the Vestry of St Leonard Shoreditch Electric Light Station later known as the Shoreditch Borough Refuse Destructor and Generating Station on Coronet Street. The building on Coronet Street is embellished with the motto E PULVERE LUX ET VIS (Out of the dust, light and power). It was built in 1896 and burned rubbish, to provide steam for the electricity generator. The waste heat was used to heat the public baths next door (and now demolished). The building is now home to the National Centre for Circus Arts.

Population and area
The metropolitan borough was conterminous with the Vestry authority, when it was formed in 1900. Statistics compiled by the London County Council, in 1901 show the population growth in London, over the preceding century.

The populations recorded in National Censuses were:

Shoreditch Vestry 1801-1899

Metropolitan Borough 1900-1961

In 1901 Shoreditch the population density was 44,600/km².

Coat of arms
The borough used coat of arms, but these were never formally granted and, therefore, not official. When the borough was merged to found the London Borough of Hackney, other charges were used to represent Shoreditch in the new coat of arms of the London Borough of Hackney.

Politics

Under the Metropolis Management Act 1855 any parish that exceeded 2,000 ratepayers was to be divided into wards; as such the incorporated vestry of St Leonard Shoreditch was divided into eight wards (electing vestrymen): No. 1 or Moorfields (18), No. 2 or Church (21), No. 3 or Hoxton (21), No. 4 or Wenlock (18), No. 5 or Whitmore (12), No. 6 or Kingsland (12), No. 7 or Haggerstone (9) and No. 8 or Acton (9).

The metropolitan borough inherited these eight wards for elections: Acton, Church, Haggerston, Hoxton, Kingsland, Moorfields, Wenlock and Whitmore.

Borough council

Parliament constituency
For elections to Parliament, the borough was divided into two constituencies:
Haggerston
Hoxton
In 1918 the borough's representation was reduced to one seat:
Shoreditch
In 1950 the borough's representation was reduced to half a seat, when it was merged with Finsbury:
Shoreditch and Finsbury

Gallery

See also
London Government Act 1899
Metropolis Management Act 1855

References

Further reading

External links
Shoreditch Town Hall Trust

Metropolitan boroughs of the County of London
History of the London Borough of Hackney
1900 establishments in the United Kingdom
1965 disestablishments in the United Kingdom
Districts abolished by the London Government Act 1963
Metropolitan Borough of